is a Japanese film director.

Filmography
 Watching People (1989)
 Spiritual Earth: Aloha Wave (1995)
 Samurai Fiction (1998)
 Pop Group Killers (2000)
 Red Shadow (2001)
 Stereo Future (2001)
 Slow Is Beautiful (2003)
 Return (2003) 
 Tajomaru (2009)
 FOOL COOL ROCK (2014)

External links

 

Hiroyuki Nakano's JMDb Listing (in Japanese)

1958 births
Japanese film directors
Living people
People from Fukuyama, Hiroshima